Miss Europe 1978, also sometimes referred to as Miss Europe 1977, was the 39th edition of the Miss Europe pageant and the 28th edition under the Mondial Events Organization. It was held in Helsinki, Finland on March 15, 1978. Eva Maria Düringer of Austria, was crowned Miss Europe 1978/1977 by outgoing titleholder Riitta Inkeri Väisänen of Finland.

Results

Placements

Contestants 

 - Eva Maria Düringer
 - Jacqueline Harmars
 - Sarah Louise Long
 - Maarit Ryhänen
 - Véronique Fagot
 - Dagmar Gabriele Winkler
 - Maria Spantidaki
 - Caroline Hooft
 - Guðbjörg (Gudbjörg) Vilhjálmsdóttir
 - Lorraine Bernadette Enriquez
 - Emanuela Goggia
 - Åshild Ottesen
 - Guillermina Ruiz-Doménech
 - Evonne Wilhelmsson
 - Gaby Bosshard

Notes

Withdrawals

"Comité Officiel et International Miss Europe" Competition

From 1951 to 2002 there was a rival Miss Europe competition organized by the "Comité Officiel et International Miss Europe". This was founded in 1950 by Jean Raibaut in Paris, the headquarters later moved to Marseille. The winners wore different titles like Miss Europe, Miss Europa or Miss Europe International.

This year, the contest took place in Reggio Emilia, Italy on September 11, 1978. There 22 contestants all representing different countries and regions of Europe. At the end, Barbara-Ann Neefs of Holland was crowned as Miss Europa 1978. She succeeded predecessor Maria Teresa Maldonado Valle of Spain.

Placements

Contestants

 - Marlene Sanchez
 - Monique DeHavilland
 - Christine Oset
 - Helena Henrikssonova
 - Christina Petersen
 - Robina Sharpe
 - Anne Marite Erkkila
 - Danielle Borchio
 - Simone Gorczak
 - Fani Griba
 - Barbara-Ann Neefs
 - Janet Gilbey
 - UNKNOWN
 - Marika Spiteri
 - Sylvie Parera
 - Helene Hornfeldt
 - Vokosava Andielkovic
 - Joanna Woolger
 - Katarina Malmros
 - Katherina Hasenknopf
 - Nazan Saatçi
 - Milena Omerzu

Notes

Withdrawals

Returns

Debuts

References

External links 
 

Miss Europe
1978 beauty pageants
1978 in Finland
1978 in Italy